The Mark 14 nuclear bomb was a 1950s strategic thermonuclear weapon, the first solid-fuel staged hydrogen bomb. It was an experimental design, and only five units were produced in early 1954. It was tested in April 1954 during the Castle Union nuclear test and had a yield of 6.9 Mt.  The bomb is often listed as the TX-14 (for "experimental") or EC-14 (for "Emergency Capability"). It has also been referred to as the "Alarm Clock" device though it has nothing to do with the design by the same name proposed earlier by Edward Teller and known as the Sloika in the Soviet Union.

The fusion fuel used by the bomb was 95% enriched Lithium isotope 6 lithium deuteride, which at the time was a scarce resource, this scarcity being chiefly responsible for its limited deployment. The Castle Bravo test showed that unenriched Lithium isotope 7 functioned as well for nuclear fusion reactions as isotope 6.

The version tested at Castle Union used a RACER IV primary. 5 Mt of its total yield came from fission, making it a very "dirty" weapon.

By 1956, the components of all five of the produced Mk-14 bombs had been recycled into Mark 17s.

See also
 List of nuclear weapons

References
Citations

Further reading
* Hansen, Chuck, "Swords of Armageddon: U.S. Nuclear Weapons Development since 1945" (CD-ROM & download available). PDF-2.67 Mb. 2,600 pages, Sunnyvale, California, Chucklea Publications, 1995, 2007.  (2nd Ed.)

Cold War aerial bombs of the United States
Nuclear bombs of the United States
Military equipment introduced in the 1950s